Swirbul is a surname. Notable people with the surname include: 

 Jake Swirbul (1898–1960), American aviation pioneer and co-founder of Grumman Aircraft Engineering Corporation
 Hailey Swirbul (born 1998), American cross-country skier
 Keegan Swirbul (born 1995), American cyclist